Molly Morag Stevens  is Professor of Biomedical Materials and regenerative medicine and Research Director for Biomedical Materials Sciences in the Institute of Biomedical Engineering at Imperial College London.

Education
Stevens studied for her bachelor's degree at the University of Bath, where she graduated with a First Class Honours degree in Pharmacy. She then gained a PhD from the University of Nottingham in 2000 for research using atomic force microscopy to investigate adhesion and mechanics.

Career and research
Following her PhD, she moved to Massachusetts Institute of Technology before joining Imperial College in 2004.

Awards and honours
In 2010 she received the International Union of Pure and Applied Chemistry (IUPAC) award for creativity in polymer science, the Institute of Materials, Minerals and Mining Rosenhain Medal and the Norman Heatley Award for interdisciplinary research from the Royal Society of Chemistry (RSC). She serves as an Associate Editor of ACS Nano.

In 2013 she presented the Woolmer Lecture of the Institute of Physics and Engineering in Medicine. In 2013 she was awarded the prestigious Karen Burt Memorial Award from the Women's Engineering Society, given to the best newly chartered woman in engineering, applied science or IT.

She was appointed a trustee of the National Gallery of the United Kingdom in 2018. She won the 2018 Institute of Physics (IOP) Rosalind Franklin Medal and Prize. In 2019 Stevens was elected a foreign member of the National Academy of Engineering of the United States and received the Kabiller Young Investigator Award. She was elected a Fellow of the Royal Society (FRS) in 2020.

References

External links 

 

Year of birth missing (living people)
Living people
Alumni of the University of Bath
Alumni of the University of Nottingham
British bioengineers
Fellows of the Royal Academy of Engineering
Female Fellows of the Royal Academy of Engineering
Women bioengineers
Academics of Imperial College London
Fellows of the Royal Society
Fellows of the Royal Society of Biology
Fellows of the Royal Society of Chemistry
Foreign associates of the National Academy of Engineering
People associated with the National Gallery, London
21st-century women engineers
Female Fellows of the Royal Society
Fellows of the Institute of Materials, Minerals and Mining